Karl von Ergert was an Austrian cavalry officer, known for his role in suppressing the revolution against Austrian rule in northern Italy in 1848 and 1849, most notably at the Battle of Novara in the latter year.

1795 births
1865 deaths
Austrian soldiers
Austrian untitled nobility
People from Jablonné v Podještědí
German Bohemian people
Austrian people of German Bohemian descent